The following is a list of episodes of Silk Stalkings.

Seasons

Episodes

Season 1 (1991–92)

Season 2 (1992–93)

Season 3 (1993–94)

Season 4 (1994–95)

Season 5 (1995–96)

Season 6 (1996–97)

Season 7 (1997–98)

Season 8 (1998–99)

References

External links
epguides.com
tv.com
TV Guide

Silk Stalkings